Area code 828 is a telephone area code in the North American Numbering Plan (NANP) for most of the western third of the U.S. state of North Carolina.  The numbering plan area (NPA) comprises the Blue Ridge Mountains and most of the Foothills. The largest city is Asheville.

Area code 828 was split from the 704 numbering plan area on March 22, 1998 to provide relief from numbering plan exhaustion brought about by the popularity of pagers and cell phones.

Service area
Among the cities and towns in the 828 numbering plan area are: Asheville, Conover, Hendersonville, Hickory, Lenoir, Maiden, Marion, Morganton,  Murphy, and  Newton.

The city of Hickory is often grouped with the Charlotte metropolitan area, but uses 828 rather than Charlotte's area codes 704 and 980.

Other communities include:

 Andrews
 Bakersville
 Barnardsville
 Black Mountain
 Blowing Rock
 Boone
 Bryson City
 Burnsville
 Brevard
 Cashiers
 Columbus
 Cherokee
 Canton
 Dillsboro
 Franklin
 Flat Rock
 Granite Falls
 Hayesville
 Highlands
 Hildebran
 Hot Springs
 Hudson
 Maggie Valley
 Maiden
 Mars Hill
 Marshall
  Old Fort
 Qualla
 Robbinsville
 Rosman
 Rutherfordton
 Spruce Pine
 Sylva
 Taylorsville
 Topton 
 Valdese
 Waynesville
 Weaverville
 Whittier

See also
 List of North Carolina area codes

Reference

External links

828
828